Oceanobacillus iheyensis is a bacterium, the type species of its genus. Its type strain is HTE831 (JCM 11309T, DSM 14371T). Oceanobacillus iheyensis HTE831 is an alkaliphilic and extremely halotolerant Bacillus-related species isolated from deep-sea sediment.

References

Further reading

External links

LPSN
Type strain of Oceanobacillus iheyensis at BacDive -  the Bacterial Diversity Metadatabase

Bacillaceae
Bacteria described in 2002